Echo Weekly was an alternative weekly newspaper serving the Kitchener, Waterloo, Cambridge, and Guelph areas in Ontario, Canada. Up until January 2008 Its offices were located in downtown Kitchener but were moved to downtown  Guelph.

It was published by Dynasty Communication Inc of Hamilton, Ontario. Dynasty also publishes similar papers in Hamilton (View Magazine) and the Niagara Region (Pulse Niagara).

History 

Echo started publishing in September 1997 by Sean Rosen, Ron Kilpatrick and Marcus Rosen. It served the 18- to 35-year-old market. Echo was published every Thursday and distributed +55,000 free copies to more than 470 locations throughout the greater Kitchener-Waterloo, Cambridge, Fergus, Elora and Guelph area.

Cessation of publication 

Echo stopped publishing in October 2011.

Masthead 

Publisher: Ron Kilpatrick
Editor-in-Chief: Ryan Farkas
Editorial Assistant: Alexandra Bates
Advertising Sales Manager: Sean Rosen
Advertising Representative: Chris Rego
Classifieds: Liz Kay

See also
List of newspapers in Canada

External links 
Echo Weekly Online

Alternative weekly newspapers published in Canada
Newspapers published in Kitchener-Waterloo
Newspapers published in Guelph
Newspapers established in 1997
Weekly newspapers published in Ontario
1997 establishments in Ontario